Ngetich is a surname of Kenyan origin that may refer to:

Priscah Ngetich, maiden name of Kenyan long-distance runner Priscah Jepleting Cherono
Wesley Ngetich Kimutai (1977–2008), Kenyan marathon runner and two-time winner of Grandma's Marathon
Gladys Ngetich (born c. 1991), Kenyan mechanical and aerospace engineer
Kipronoh Arap Ngetich
(born 1994),Computer Scientist aspiring to be Member of Parliament for Konoin Constituency 
2027 elections

See also
Kipngetich

Kalenjin names